Oare is a village and civil parish on Oare Water on Exmoor in the Somerset West and Taunton district of Somerset, England.

History

The village was known as Are in the Domesday Book of 1086. After the Norman Conquest the manor was granted to Ralph de Pomeray. Later it was held by the Kelly family.

Oare was part of the hundred of Carhampton.

Governance

The parish council has responsibility for local issues, including setting an annual precept (local rate) to cover the council's operating costs and producing annual accounts for public scrutiny. The parish council evaluates local planning applications and works with the local police, district council officers, and neighbourhood watch groups on matters of crime, security, and traffic.

The parish council's role also includes initiating projects for the maintenance and repair of parish facilities, as well as consulting with the district council on the maintenance, repair, and improvement of highways, drainage, footpaths, public transport, and street cleaning. Conservation matters (including trees and listed buildings) and environmental issues are also the responsibility of the council.

The village falls within the non-metropolitan district of Somerset West and Taunton, which was established on 1 April 2019. It was previously in the district of West Somerset, which was formed on 1 April 1974 under the Local Government Act 1972, and part of Williton Rural District before that. The district council is responsible for local planning and building control, local roads, council housing, environmental health, markets and fairs, refuse collection and recycling, cemeteries and crematoria, leisure services, parks, and tourism.

Somerset County Council is responsible for running the largest and most expensive local services such as education, social services, libraries, main roads, public transport, policing and fire services, trading standards, waste disposal and strategic planning.

As Oare falls within the Exmoor National Park some functions normally administered by district or county councils have, since 1997, fallen under the Exmoor National Park Authority, which is known as a 'single purpose' authority, which aims to "conserve and enhance the natural beauty, wildlife and cultural heritage of the National Parks" and "promote opportunities for the understanding and enjoyment of the special qualities of the Parks by the public", including responsibility for the conservation of the historic environment.

It is also part of the Bridgwater and West Somerset county constituency represented in the House of Commons of the Parliament of the United Kingdom. It elects one Member of Parliament (MP) by the first past the post system of election.

Geography
Oare is located within the Oare valley, part of the wider East Lyn Valley. Within the parish is Glenthorne a geological Site of Special Scientific Interest which is a Geological Conservation Review site because of the Trentishoe Member (formerly accorded 'formation' status) of the Hangman Sandstone Formation (formerly accorded 'group' status). The Hangman Sandstone represents the Middle Devonian sequence of North Devon and Somerset. These unusual freshwater deposits in the Hangman Grits were mainly formed in desert conditions.

Landmarks
Several bridges are prominent. Oare bridge is an 18th-century road bridge over Oare Water, and the 17th-century packhorse Malmsmead Bridge over Badgworthy Water. Robber's Bridge is an old masonry arch bridge in the royal forest of Exmoor, carrying the minor road from Porlock Hill to Oare. It crosses Weir Water and is located down a steep, wooded lane beneath overhanging trees.

Religious sites

The Church of St Mary dates from the 15th century and has been designated by English Heritage as a Grade II* listed building.

Cultural references
The fictional wedding of Lorna Doone in R. D. Blackmore's novel was set in the Church of St Mary, where Blackmore's grandfather had been the rector from 1809–1842.

Jonathan Hill, Baron Hill of Oareford, holds the barony of Hill of Oareford.

References

External links

Villages in West Somerset
Exmoor
Civil parishes in Somerset